The RagWing RW4 Midwing Sport is a single seat, strut-braced mid wing, single engine ultralight aircraft designed by Roger Mann and sold as plans by RagWing Aircraft Designs for amateur construction.

Design and development
The RW4 was derived from the high-wing RagWing RW1 Ultra-Piet as an FAR 103 Ultralight Vehicles compliant aircraft that would have an empty weight within that category's  empty weight limit. The RW4 was designed to be an ultralight replica of the classic 1931 vintage Church Midwing Sport Monoplane pylon racer.

The RW4 airframe is constructed entirely from wood and covered with aircraft fabric. The landing gear is of conventional configuration with bungee suspension. As on the original Church design the RW4 has a gap between the wing and fuselage to allow the pilot to see downwards. The   Half VW four-stroke engine,  Rotax 277 two-stroke and  2si 430 two-stroke have also been used.

Partial kits and construction kits were available in the late 1990s, but today the aircraft is offered only in the form of plans. Reported construction time is 400–600 hours, although the designer claims 350 hours.

Specifications (RW4)

References

External links

1990s United States ultralight aircraft